The 1973 Grand National was the 127th renewal of the Grand National horse race that took place at the Aintree Racecourse near Liverpool, England, on 31 March 1973.

The race is best remembered for being the first of Red Rum's three Grand National wins; Red Rum also broke the record set by Reynoldstown in 1935, and in doing so staged a spectacular comeback to beat Crisp on the run-in after having trailed by 15 lengths at the final fence.

Before the off, Red Rum was 9/1 joint-favourite with Crisp to win the race. However, by the time the runners had reached The Chair the Australian chaser Crisp, who was carrying the top weight of 12 stone, had already built up a significant lead and appeared unstoppable. For much of the initial stages, Crisp's closest challenger was Bill Shoemark on Grey Sombrero, but he fell at The Chair, giving Crisp an even greater lead which had grown to 20 lengths by the end of the first circuit.

Crisp's jockey Richard Pitman later recalled that at Becher's Brook on the second circuit, fallen jockey David Nicholson shouted at him: "Richard, you're 33 lengths clear, kick on and you'll win!" At the same time, he heard the Tannoy commentator Michael O'Hehir declare: "And Red Rum is coming out of the pack, Brian Fletcher is kicking him hard!"

At the 30th and final fence, Crisp was still 15 lengths ahead of Red Rum, ridden by Fletcher and given 10 stone 5 lb by the handicapper. However, Crisp was beginning to tire badly on the 494-yard run-in, carrying 23 lb more than his nearest rival. Red Rum made up considerable ground, and two strides from the finishing post he pipped Crisp by a mere three-quarters of a length in a record time of nine minutes, 1.9 seconds (a record which would stand until 1990).

The third horse, L'Escargot, who would win the National two years later, was 25 lengths adrift at the finish.

There was one equine fatality during the race when Grey Sombrero fell at The Chair whilst leading the pursuit of Crisp. He suffered a broken leg and was euthanised, becoming the first fatal casualty of the Grand National since Racoon in 1970. Grey Sombrero is one of three horses to have been fatally injured while jumping The Chair in the Grand National (the others were Land Lark in 1975 and Kintai in 1979).

1973 is often considered among the greatest Grand Nationals of all time, and the dramatic final-stretch battle between the two greats Crisp and Red Rum has also been described as one of the greatest sporting moments.

Finishing order

Non-finishers

Media coverage and aftermath

David Coleman presented the BBC's coverage in a special edition of Grandstand. Grandstand would also show the international rugby union match between Scotland and The President's XV from Murrayfield, along with a preview of the big heavyweight bout from San Diego between Muhammad Ali and Ken Norton, that was shown later on BBC 1 in a Sportsnight special.
Unfortunately, Grey Sombrero, who had fallen at the 15th fence was badly injured and had to be euthanized.

References 

 1973
Grand National
Grand National
20th century in Lancashire
Grand National